Carlo Fabrizio Giustiniani (12 December 1621 – 1 September 1682) was a Roman Catholic prelate who served as Bishop of Accia and Mariana (1656–1682).

Biography
Carlo Fabrizio Giustiniani was born in Genoa, Italy on 12 December 1621 and ordained a priest on 20 December 1648. On 10 January 1656, he was appointed during the papacy of Pope Alexander VII as Bishop of Accia and Mariana. On 16 January 1656, he was consecrated bishop by Giulio Cesare Sacchetti, Cardinal-Bishop of Frascati, with Ascanio Piccolomini, Archbishop of Siena, and Giovanni Agostino Marliani, Bishop Emeritus of Accia and Mariana, serving as co-consecrators. In 1676, he began construction of Notre-Dame-des-Grâces-de-Lavasina church, dedicated to the Virgin Mary, on the site where two miracles had occurred. He served as Bishop of Accia and Mariana until his death on 1 September 1682.

While bishop, he was the principal co-consecrator of Adamo Gentile, Bishop of Lipari (1660).

References 

17th-century Roman Catholic bishops in Genoa
Bishops appointed by Pope Alexander VII
1621 births
1682 deaths